Pihak Berkuasa Negeri Sabah v Sugumar Balakrishnan & Another (2002) 4 CLJ 105 was a case heard in the Federal Court of Malaysia. Sugumar Balakrishnan sought the reinstatement of his entry permit to the state of Sabah. The Federal Court ultimately ruled that the right to personal liberty guaranteed by Article 5 of the Constitution cannot be construed in broad, generous terms, and as such denied Sugumar's application.

Background

Sugumar had applied to the High Court for a writ of certiorari to quash the decision of the Sabah state government which revoked his entry permit on grounds of morality. The High Court held that the ouster clause in section 59a of the Immigration Act 1959/63 meant the courts had no grounds for judicial review of the Sabah government's decision.

Sugumar appealed to the Court of Appeal, which overruled the High Court and granted the writ he sought. The Court of Appeal held that ouster clauses are unconstitutional except in cases of national security (such as those involving the Internal Security Act) or overriding national interest. The preclusion of the right to judicial review was a violation of Article 5 of the Constitution, which was to be read in a broad manner, in line with Tan Tek Seng v. Suruhanjaya Perkhidmatan Pendidikan & Another. The Court of Appeal further ruled that Parliament had not intended to give the East Malaysian states of Sabah and Sarawak untrammeled discretion to cancel entry permits. The Sabah authorities then appealed to the Federal Court.

Judgment

The Federal Court quashed the Court of Appeal decision. With regard to the Immigration Act, Federal Justice Mohamed Dzaiddin held:

The Federal Court also overruled the Court of Appeal ruling on the broad interpretation of Article 5 liberties in Tan Tek Seng:

In 2009, the Federal Court would go on to reverse itself in Lee Kwan Woh v. Public Prosecutor, holding that constitutional liberties must be read generously and not literally.

References

See also

 Loh Wai Kong v. Government of Malaysia

Malaysian constitutional law
Malaysian case law
2002 in case law
2002 in Malaysia